The Principle Six campaign, also Principle 6, or P6, was launched in January 2014 as an Olympic protests of Russian anti-gay laws in conjunction with the 2014 Winter Olympics being held in Sochi, Russia. Principle 6 refers to the sixth principle of the Olympic Charter that says any form of discrimination "is incompatible with belonging to the Olympic Movement."

Human rights campaigner Peter Tatchell noted that openly gay and lesbian athletes are actively discriminated against in Russia as well as dozens of countries that criminalize same-sex relationships, or gay people generally on an institutional level. "These are clear breaches of the anti-discrimination Principle Six of the Olympic Charter. Yet the International Olympic Committee has said and done nothing. It is allowing the Russian government to ban the Pride House and discriminate against lesbian, gay, bisexual, and transgender (LGBT) athletes and spectators."

The Principle Six campaign was put together by All Out, a social media organizing advocacy group with 1.9 million members come from every country in the world, and Athlete Ally, an organization working to end homophobia and transphobia in sports by reaching out to athletic communities.  American Apparel partnered with the two groups to produce and distribute Principle 6 gear online and in their stores globally

Background
Olympic protests of Russian anti-gay laws arose in the months leading up to the 2014 Winter Olympics in Sochi, Russia. Scheduled to take place from 6 to 23 February 2014, the Olympic Games is a major international multi-sport event that occurs once every four years. Up to that time that atmosphere in future and politics for lesbian, gay, bisexual, and transgender (LGBT) people has been generally improving. In 2013 Russia received criticism from around the world and across the international community for enacting a law that bans the distribution of "propaganda of non-traditional sexual relations" to minors. Since the passage of the anti-gay propaganda law, the media has reported the arrest of a gay rights activist as well as a surging incidence of hate crimes motivated by homophobia, including hate crimes perpetrated by neo-Nazi groups against gay minors. A law prohibiting gay pride parades in Moscow for one-hundred years has also recently been enacted.

International pressure was leveraged to compel the International Olympic Committee (IOC) to move the Olympics to another country, as well as pressure on Olympic sponsors to take a stand for LGBT equality. In tandem, calls to boycott and protest the Olympics before, during, and after the games, also went out, with various organizations and groups organizing efforts. In addition several politicians, including U.S. President Barack Obama, and members of his administration, and other world leaders have publicly stated they would not attend, and these actions have been tied to the protest efforts. In the U.S., the Olympic delegation is made up of several LGBT Olympians, and athletes including Brian Boitano, and Martina Navratilova.

In response to protest and boycott efforts, corporations and the IOC have made steps to guarantee the safety of their employees, athletes, and staff, who are in Russia in advance or during the Olympics.

On-site ambassadors in Sochi, Russia
Athletes expected to attend and compete at the Sochi Winter Olympic Games 
 Australian snowboarder Belle Brockhoff 
 Australian bobsled team captain Heath Spence 
 Canadian alpine skier Mike Janyk 
 Canadian snowboarder Alex Duckworth

Olympic athlete co-signers

 four-time Olympic gold medal diver Greg Louganis
 four-time Olympic luger and International Sports Law expert Cameron Myler
 two-time Olympic middle-distance runner Nick Symmonds
 Australian tennis player and four-time Olympian Rennae Stubbs
 ParaPan Am gold medalist archer Lee Ford
 figure skater Mark Janoschak
 gold medalist and soccer player Megan Rapinoe
 gold medalist and soccer player Lori Lindsey
 soccer player Hedvig Lindahl
 soccer player Sally Shipard
 soccer player Robbie Rogers
 soccer player Chris Seitz
 two-time gold medalist rower Caryn Davies
 Irish Olympic runner Ciarán Ó Lionáird
 former Soviet archer Khatuna Lorig
 U.S. basketball star Teresa Edwards
 U.S. swimmer Dan Veatch
 U.S. Paralympian Tanner Gers
 Paralympic bronze medalist Lindsey Carmichael
 wrestler Ben Provisor
 Ice Hockey player Caitlin Cahow
 tennis star Martina Navratilova
 tennis star Andy Roddick
 tennis star Mardy Fish
 Australian bobsledder Jana Pittman
 tennis star James Blake
 rower Esther Lofgren
 Paralympic Australian basketball player Sarah Stewart
 Australian Olympic trampoline silver medalist Ji Wallace
 Swiss snowboarder Simona Meiler
 American fencer Race Imboden
 U.S. diver David Pichler
 U.S. snowboarder Callan Chythlook-Sifsof
 U.S. snowboarder Seth Wescott
 Canadian speed skater Anastasia Bucsis
 German bronze medal fencer Joerg Fiedler
 U.S. Paralympic tennis player Sharon Kelleher
 U.S. speed skater and silver medalist Miriam Rothstein
 German silver medal fencer Imke Duplitzer
 U.S. beach volleyball player Jen Kessey
 Canadian biathlete Rosanna Crawford

Professional athlete co-signers

 NFL star Chris Kluwe
 NFL star Brendon Ayanbadejo
 NFL star Scott Fujita
 NFL star Donté Stallworth
 Tennis star Martina Navratilova
 Tennis star Andy Roddick
 Tennis star James Blake
 Tennis star Mardy Fish
 MLS player Stephen McCarthy
 MLS player Robbie Rogers
 NBA player Steve Nash
 NBA player Jason Collins
 WNBA player Teresa Edwards
 WNBA player Kristi Toliver
 Rugby player David Pocock
 Race car driver Leilani Munter
 Australian national soccer team player Michelle Heyman
 Australian national soccer team player Lydia Williams
 Endurance swimmer Diana Nyad

References

21st century in LGBT history
Olympic Games controversies
Sexual orientation and sports
2014 Winter Olympics
LGBT rights in Russia
2010s in LGBT history
2014 in LGBT history